Padmanabhapuram is a town and a municipality near Thuckalay in Kanyakumari district in the Indian state of Tamil Nadu. As of 2011, the town had a population of 21,342.

History
Padmanabhapuram was the erstwhile capital of the Kingdom of Travancore (now part of India). The Travancore King, Rama Varma, who was popularly known as Dharma Raja, shifted the capital in 1795 from Padmanabhapuram to Thiruvananthapuram. By that time, the boundaries of the Travancore had extended to less than half of the present day Indian state of Kerala. Up to 1957, Padmanabhapuram formed part of the Travancore Kingdom and subsequently the Travancore-Cochin  State. It was when the states were divided on linguistic basis that Kalkulam (including Padmanabhapuram), Vilavancode, Thovala and Agastheeswaram Taluks of erstwhile Thiruvananthapuram District of Travancore-Cochin State were included in the Madras State (later renamed as Tamil Nadu) as Kanyakumari District.

Geography
It has an average elevation of 15 metres (49 feet).

Demographics
According to 2011 census, Padmanabhapuram had a population of 21,342 with a sex-ratio of 1,029 females for every 1,000 males, much above the national average of 929. A total of 2,120 were under the age of six, constituting 1,084 males and 1,036 females. The average literacy of the town was 83.92%, compared to the national average of 72.99%. The town had a total of : 5549 households. There were a total of 7,036 workers, comprising 54 cultivators, 388 main agricultural labourers, 87 in house hold industries, 5,481 other workers, 1,026 marginal workers, 16 marginal cultivators, 73 marginal agricultural labourers, 54 marginal workers in household industries and 883 other marginal workers.

Tourism

The popular Padmanabhapuram Palace, the old palace of the Travancore kings, is also located here. The palace is known for it antiques, including the armoury of the royal family. The woodwork in this palace is intricate. This Palace is maintained by the Govt.of Kerala Archaeology Department. According to ancient records, this charming centuries old palace was built in the Kalkulam forts by Iravi Varma Kulasekharan in the 16th century. Ravi Varma Kulashekhara Perumal’s dream abode now stands as an architectural wonder that echoes the praises of ancient Indian craftsmanship and glory.

Other tourist locations include Thirparappu Waterfalls, Hanging Bridge in Mathoor, Ancient Jain Temple in Chitharal (a small village situated at a distance of 8 km from Marthandam.)  Thiruvalluvar Statue in Kanniyakumari. 

One can take a bus from Thiruvananthapuram or Nagercoil and get down at Thuckalay, which is two kilometres away from Padmanabhapuram.

The nearest places around this old capital city of South travancore is Marunthukottai (It is a very old fort having weapons storage facility), Saralvilai, Kumarakovil (Lord Murugan Temple), Moolachel, Charode, Manali and Udaygiri fort.

Temple
There are many temples around Padmnanbhapuram Palace: Padmanabhapuram Madan-Ishakkiamman Temple, Padmanabhapuram Bhuththan Temple, Padmanabhapuram Pillayar Temple, Padmanabhapuram Murgan Temple, Ramaswamy Temple, Padmanabhapuram Sarswathy Amman Temple, Perumal Temple, Neelakandaswamy Temple and  Padmanabhapuram Chettu Samudhaya Mutharamman Temple 

Thirukarthikai is the famous festival celebrated at Padmanabhapuram Chettu Samudhaya Mutharamman Temple.

Politics
Padmanabhapuram assembly constituency is part of Nagercoil (Lok Sabha constituency).

References

Cities and towns in Kanyakumari district
Culture of Kerala
Historical Indian regions
Former capital cities in India